Muzio Cinquini (died 1627) was a Roman Catholic prelate who served as Bishop of Avellino e Frigento (1609–1627).

Biography
On 10 June 1609, Muzio Cinquini was appointed during the papacy of Pope Paul V as Bishop of Avellino e Frigento.
He served as Bishop of Avellino e Frigento until his resignation on 15 December 1625.
He died on 10 April 1627.

While bishop, he was the principal co-consecrator of Bernardino Piccoli, Titular Archbishop of Nicaea and Coadjutor Bishop of Strongoli.

References

External links and additional sources
 (for Chronology of Bishops) 
 (for Chronology of Bishops) 

17th-century Italian Roman Catholic bishops
Bishops appointed by Pope Paul V
1627 deaths